The women's team foil was one of eight fencing events on the fencing at the 1992 Summer Olympics programme. It was the ninth appearance of the event. The competition was held from 3 to 4 August 1992. 60 fencers from 12 nations competed.

Rosters

Canada
 Thalie Tremblay
 Renée Aubin
 Hélène Bourdages
 Shelley Wetterberg
 Marie-Françoise Hervieu

China
 E Jie
 Liang Jun
 Wang Huifeng
 Xiao Aihua
 Ye Lin

France
 Camille Couzi
 Gisèle Meygret
 Laurence Modaine-Cessac
 Julie-Anne Gross
 Isabelle Spennato

Germany
 Zita-Eva Funkenhauser
 Sabine Bau
 Anja Fichtel-Mauritz
 Monika Weber-Koszto
 Annette Dobmeier

Great Britain
 Fiona McIntosh
 Linda Strachan
 Julia Bracewell
 Amanda Ferguson
 Sarah Mawby

Hungary
 Gabriella Lantos
 Ildikó Nébaldné Mincza
 Zsuzsa Némethné Jánosi
 Ildikó Pusztai
 Gertrúd Stefanek

Italy
 Giovanna Trillini
 Margherita Zalaffi
 Francesca Bortolozzi-Borella
 Diana Bianchedi
 Dorina Vaccaroni

Poland
 Katarzyna Felusiak
 Monika Maciejewska
 Anna Sobczak
 Barbara Wolnicka-Szewczyk
 Agnieszka Szuchnicka

Romania
 Reka Zsofia Lazăr-Szabo
 Claudia Grigorescu
 Elisabeta Guzganu-Tufan
 Laura Cârlescu-Badea
 Roxana Dumitrescu

South Korea
 I Jeong-Suk
 Sin Seong-Ja
 Kim Jin-sun
 Jang Mi-Gyeong
 Jeon Mi-Gyeong

Unified Team
 Yelena Glikina
 Yelena Grishina
 Tatyana Sadovskaya
 Olga Velichko
 Olga Voshchakina

United States
 Caitlin Bilodeaux
 Mary O'Neill
 Molly Sullivan
 Ann Marsh
 Sharon Monplaisir

Results

Round 1

Round 1 Pool A

Round 1 Pool B

Round 1 Pool C

Round 1 Pool D

Elimination rounds

References

Foil team
1992 in women's fencing
Women's events at the 1992 Summer Olympics